Mazhar Kamran is an Indian film and documentary film director and cinematographer.  Kamran graduated with a B.Tech. from the Indian Institute of Technology Madras, but because of his love for films he chose film making as a profession. He started his career as a cinematographer in the 1998 Ram Gopal Varma film Satya. Kamran studied cinematography from Film and Television Institute of India. Kamran's directorial debut Mohandas dealt with stolen identity.

Filmography

Director
Mohandas

Cinematographer
Satya
Kaun
Tarkieb
Jhankaar Beats
Masti
Mohandas

Documentary
Ainie Apa
Film on the eminent Urdu author Qurratulain Hyder for the archives of Sahitya Akademi
The 30 minute film fuses Hyder's memories with her writings along with reflections from literary figures. 
Hyder is considered to be a trendsetter novelist in the world of Urdu literature. Her monumental work is ‘Aag Ka Darya’ which moves from 4BC to the post independence period.
Lucknow Legacy of an Era
Film on his home town Lucknow for UP Tourism
In Search of the Agaria.
Film on the iron-smelting tribe Agaria for the History Channel (FOX India)
The Agaria Tribes are an indigenous tribe in India and are known for their traditional technique of iron smelting. Yet this traditional knowledge is fast fading with fewer Agarias practicing iron smelting and instead turning to metal work or farming to meet their needs. Presented under the series "Colours of India", In Search of the Agaria, directed by Mazhar Kamran, is a film that revolves around this theme. The film documents Kamran's search of an agrarian iron smelter and is interspersed with the view points of various experts, graphical representations and the lifestyle of this tribe.

Awards
Nominations

Grand Prix (Regard d'Or) Fribourg International Film Festival 2009
New Directors, San Francisco International Film Festival 2009
Special Jury Prize (won) Innsbruck International FIlm Festival, Austria

References

External links

Indian documentary filmmakers
Hindi film cinematographers
IIT Madras alumni
Living people
Hindi-language film directors
Film and Television Institute of India alumni
Year of birth missing (living people)